The following is a list of Sites of Special Scientific Interest in the Stirling Area of Search. For other areas, see List of SSSIs by Area of Search.

 Abbey Craig
 Arnprior Glen
 Aucheneck
 Balglass Corries
 Ballagan Glen
 Ballanucater
 Balquhidderock Wood
 Ben An and Brenachoile Woods
 Ben Heasgarnich
 Ben Lawers
 Ben Lomond
 Ben Lui
 Ben More - Stob Binnein
 Blackwater Marshes
 Blane, Drumore and Station Woods  De-notified (confirmed) on 2 June 2011
 Brig O'Turk Mires
 Cambusurich Wood
 Carbeth Loch
 Coille Chriche
 Coille Coire Chuilc
 Collymoon Moss
 Conic Hill
 Craigallian Marshes
 Craigrostan Woods
 Crom Allt  De-notified (confirmed) on 2 June 2011
 Cuilvona And Craigmore Woods
 Dalveich Meadow
 Double Craigs
 Drumore Wood
 Dumbroch Loch Meadows
 Edinample Meadow
 Edinchip Wood
 Endrick Mouth and Islands
 Endrick Water
 Fairy Knowe And Doon Hill
 Falls of Dochart
 Finlarig Burn
 Firth of Forth
 Flanders Moss
 Garabal Hill
 Gartfarran Woods
 Glen Falloch Pinewood
 Glen Falloch Woods
 Glen Lochay Woods
 Inchcruin
 Inchmoan
 Innishewan Wood
 Killorn Moss
 Kippenrait Glen
 Lake of Menteith
 Leny Quarry
 Lime Craig Quarry
 Lime Hill
 Loch Lubnaig Marshes
 Loch Macanrie Fens
 Loch Mahaick
 Loch Tay Marshes
 Loch Watston
 Lochan Lairig Cheile
 Meall Ghaordie
 Meall na Samhna
 Mollands
 Mugdock Wood
 Ochtertyre Moss
 Offerance Moss
 Pass of Leny Flushes
 Pollochro Woods
 Quoigs Meadow
 River Dochart Meadows
 Rowardennan Woodlands
 Sauchie Craig Wood
 Shirgarton Moss
 Stronvar Marshes
 Tynaspirit
 Wester Balgair Meadow
 Wester Moss
 Westerton Water Meadow
 Wolfs Hole Quarry

 
Stirling